"All Night" is a song by Swedish synthpop duo Icona Pop, from their second studio and international debut album, This Is... Icona Pop (2013). The album was released worldwide on 23 July 2013, as a digital download by Swedish independent record label TEN Music Group, as well as Atlantic Records subsidiary Big Beat Records. The song is the second single to be released from the album, following "Girlfriend". It was featured in the film Neighbors and appears on the film's soundtrack.

Composition 
According to the sheet music published at Musicnotes.com, "All Night" is written in the key of E major with a tempo of 120 beats per minute. It follows a chord progression of A-E-C#m-B.

Music video 
The video for "All Night" was directed by Marc Klasfeld and follows the hidden lifestyle of nightlife performers in the ball culture, particularly, but not limited to, drag queens. The music video is set in New York City and sheds light on the back story of some of the performers, as they reveal their hidden identities and why they chose to become a part of the underground business. As the show gets under way, the host reveals that two groups will be participating in the night's fashion show (known in the video as "The Ball"), House of Sparkle and House of Spirit. As Icona Pop performs, the "Paris Is Burning"-esque "vogue-off" gets under way. Performers arrive onto the platform and are then judged by a panel based on their stride down the catwalk. As costumes become more extravagant and groups try to out do each other, Icona Pop claims that "they can do it all night". Towards the end of the video, performers are exposed as both, their real self and the identity they portray every night. The performers provide an in depth short cut interview into some of the reasons they take part in "house ballroom" culture. Some of the performers include; Chi Chi, Pony, Jeremy, Marie, Derrick, Javier, Gisele, Mother Leiomy, Princess Lockerooo and Father Jose. At the end of the music video, a performer is left with the final word of the night by saying; "For whatever it is that you're bringing, your outfit, your body, your face, your skills. These people put so much effort and so much energy and so much love into everything that they do. It's a role of creativity and I'll take it. I'll take all of it".

Track listing

Charts and certifications

Weekly charts

Year-end charts

Certifications

Release history

See also
 List of number-one dance singles of 2013 (U.S.)

References

2013 songs
2013 singles
Icona Pop songs
Big Beat Records (American record label) singles
Music videos directed by Marc Klasfeld
Songs written by Elof Loelv
Songs written by Luke Steele (musician)
Songs written by Nick Littlemore
Songs written by Aino Jawo
Songs written by Caroline Hjelt
Songs written by Brian Lee (songwriter)
Song recordings produced by Elof Loelv